Zafarwal Tehsil, headquartered at Zafarwal, is one of the three Tehsils (sub-divisions) of Narowal District in the Punjab province of Pakistan. Zafarwal is capital of Zafarwal Tehsil.

Geography
It is located at 32°21'0N 74°54'0E with an altitude of 268 metres (882 feet). It is 7 km from Jammu District, India.

References

Narowal District
Tehsils of Punjab, Pakistan